Aethes spartinana is a species of moth of the family Tortricidae first described by William Barnes and James Halliday McDunnough in 1916. It is found in North America, where it has been recorded from Illinois, Indiana, Iowa, Maine, Massachusetts and South Dakota.

Adults have been recorded on wing in January and from July to September.

The larvae feed on Spartina pectinata. They bore though the glumes and feed on the florets inside. A single larva generally feeds on a series of consecutive spikelets. Later, they tunnel into the stem of their host plant.

References

spartinana
Moths described in 1916
Moths of North America